Ken Muggleston (24 April 1930 – c. 2021) was an Australian set decorator. He won an Academy Award in the category Best Art Direction for the film Oliver! Muggleston's death was announced in April 2021.

Selected filmography
 Oliver! (1968)

References

External links

1930 births
2020s deaths
Best Art Direction Academy Award winners
British set decorators
People from Sydney